Khanpur Railway Station (Urdu and ) is located in Khanpur city, Rahim Yar Khan district of Punjab province of the Pakistan. It is a major railway station of Pakistan Railways on Karachi-Peshawar main line.

The station is staffed and has advance and current reservation offices. Food stalls are also located on it platforms.

Train routes
The routes are Khanpur from linked to Karachi, Lahore, Rawalpindi, Peshawar, Quetta, Multan, Faisalabad, Sargodha, Sialkot, Gujranwala, Hyderabad, Sukkur, Jhang, Rahim Yar Khan, Nawabshah, Bahawalpur, Attock, Sibi, Khanewal, Gujrat, Rohri, Jacobabad, and Nowshera.

See also
 List of railway stations in Pakistan
 Pakistan Railways

References

External links
Official Web Site of Pakistan Railways

Railway stations in Rahim Yar Khan District
Railway stations on Karachi–Peshawar Line (ML 1)
Railway stations on Khanpur–Chachran Railway